The Santa Cruz River ( "Holy Cross River") is a tributary river to the Gila River in Southern Arizona and northern Sonora, Mexico.

Course

The Santa Cruz has its headwaters in the high intermontane grasslands of the San Rafael Valley to the southeast of Patagonia, Arizona, between the Canelo Hills to the east and the Patagonia Mountains to the west, just north of the international border. It flows southward into Mexico past Santa Cruz, Sonora and turns westward around the south end of the Sierra San Antonio near Miguel Hidalgo (San Lázaro), thence north-northwest to reenter the United States just to the east of Nogales and southwest of Kino Springs. It then continues northward from the international border past the Tumacacori National Historical Park, Tubac, Green Valley, Sahuarita, San Xavier del Bac, Tucson, Marana, and Picacho Peak State Park to the Santa Cruz Flats just to the south of Casa Grande and the Gila River. Before the development of agriculture in the Santa Cruz Flats, the river's course went right through the flats. As development started, the Greene Canal was formed to divert the Santa Cruz River to the Greene Wash to maximize agriculture in the area. Because of this diversion, the original Santa Cruz River riverbed was destroyed. From the Greene Canal, the Greene Wash empties into the Santa Rosa Wash which empties into the original Santa Cruz River riverbed. This riverbed is followed all the way until it terminates at the Gila River. Between Nogales and Tucson the river valley is flanked by the San Cayetano and Santa Rita Mountains on the east and the Atascosa, Tumacacori, and Sierrita Mountains on the west.

Hydrography
Most of the Santa Cruz River is usually a dry riverbed, unless the area receives significant rainfall. This was not always the case, but a combination of human errors and natural catastrophes in the late nineteenth century led to the decline of the Santa Cruz. Prior to this, water flowed perennially in a number of places, including along nine stretches in the Tucson area, and the river's banks were lined with cottonwood and mesquite bosques. Although there is some disagreement among historians and hydrologists as to what the biggest causes of the river's decline was, contributing human factors included overgrazing, excessive pumping of groundwater for agricultural irrigation and industry, and the construction of dams and ditches. In the mid-20th century, the river's stretch through Tucson dried up completely.

The city of Nogales, Sonora, has been releasing treated sewage into the Santa Cruz River since 1951.

In recent years, due to water conservation efforts and restoration projects, perennial flows have returned to a few parts of the Santa Cruz River in greater Tucson. In June 2019, the city of Tucson began releasing treated wastewater daily into the Santa Cruz River bed near West Silverlake Road as part of the Santa Cruz River Heritage Project. This has resulted in renewed perennial flow in an approximately  stretch near downtown Tucson. Further upstream, perennial flows returned to a half-mile stretch of the river through the San Xavier Indian Reservation of the Tohono Oʼodham Nation in 2019 as a result of reduced ground water pumping due to greater availability of water from the Central Arizona Project. This has led to the revival of vegetated riparian zones along the river, including areas of cottonwood shoots and seep-willow.

Recreation
The Juan Bautista de Anza National Historic Trail parallels much of the Santa Cruz. In Marana, there are approximately ten paved miles of multi-use recreational path along the Santa Cruz, located on Tangerine Road and through the Gladden Farms community park.

Gallery

See also

 List of rivers of Arizona
 Santa Cruz Catholic Church

References

External links
 Santa Cruz River Civic Science Conservation Initiative
 San Rafael Ranch Natural Area and state park
 Sign posted along the bank of the Santa Cruz River in Tucson

 
Rivers of Arizona
International rivers of North America
Rivers of Santa Cruz County, Arizona
Rivers of Pima County, Arizona
Rivers of Pinal County, Arizona
Tributaries of the Gila River
Rivers of Sonora